Lawrence Alan Blum (born April 16, 1943) is an American philosopher who is Distinguished Professor of Liberal Arts and Education and Emeritus Professor of Philosophy at the University of Massachusetts, Boston. He is known for his work in the philosophy of education, moral philosophy, and race.

References

External links
Personal website

1943 births
Living people
Fellows of the National Endowment for the Humanities
21st-century American philosophers
Jewish philosophers
University of Massachusetts Boston faculty
People from Baltimore
Princeton University alumni
Alumni of Linacre College, Oxford
Harvard University alumni
Social philosophers
Philosophers of education